Macaduma strongyla is a moth of the subfamily Arctiinae. It was described by Turner in 1922. It is found in Australia, where it has been recorded from Queensland and New South Wales.

The wingspan is about 30 mm. The forewings grey brown and the hindwings are brown.

References

Macaduma
Moths described in 1922